Gretchen Bangert (born June 11, 1966) is an American politician who has served in the Missouri House of Representatives since 2017, first elected from the 69th district, and as of 2022 from the 70th district.

Electoral history

State Representative

References

1966 births
Living people
Democratic Party members of the Missouri House of Representatives
21st-century American politicians
Women state legislators in Missouri
21st-century American women politicians